Adedayo Adeyemi Adebayo (born 30 November 1970 in Ibadan, Nigeria) is a rugby union footballer, who played on the wing for England 8 times between 1996 and 1998. He played club rugby for Bath and Parma and then went on to coach the Scottish-based sevens side, Bone Steelers. He started for Bath in the victorious 1998 Heineken Cup Final as they defeated Brive.

Career 
Adebayo made his international debut on 23 November 1996 against Italy, a match which England went on to win 54-21. His final appearance in an England shirt was on 22 March 1998 against Scotland.

He was a member of the England sevens squad which won the inaugural World Cup Sevens in Scotland in 1993. He turned and twisted to bring off a memorable tackle, that helped England reach the final.

He is the CEO and founder of Premier Lifestyle, a corporate hospitality company based in England.

References

External links 
Bone Steelers
Parma Rugby
Bath Rugby
Premier Lifestyle

1970 births
Living people
English rugby union players
Rugby union wings
Bath Rugby players
England international rugby union players
Black British sportsmen
English people of Nigerian descent
English people of Yoruba descent
Yoruba sportspeople
Nigerian emigrants to the United Kingdom
Sportspeople from Ibadan
Southland rugby union players
England international rugby sevens players
Male rugby sevens players